The Spiral Staircase is a 1961 American television film. It is a television adaptation of Ethel Lina White's novel Some Must Watch which was filmed in 1946 as The Spiral Staircase. It was directed by Boris Sagal.

Plot summary

Cast
 Elizabeth Montgomery as Helen Warren
 Lillian Gish as Mrs. Warren
 Gig Young as Stephen Warren
 Edie Adams as Blanche
 Eddie Albert as Albert Warren
 Jeffrey Lynn as Doctor Parry
 Frank McHugh as Constable Williams

Production
The production was the idea of David Susskind who originally wanted Jane Fonda to play the lead.

It was part of a series on NBC called Theatre '62. Spiral Staircase was to be the first of eight productions of David O. Selznick movies. Eventually the lead role went to Elizabeth Montgomery and her then-husband Gig Young.

Reception
"It was a routine play but they made it look pretty good", said the Los Angeles Times.

References

External links
 
 
 The Spiral Staircase at BFI

1961 films
Films directed by Boris Sagal